Pinjarra Road is a major west-east road connecting the two major centres of the Peel Region, Mandurah and Pinjarra. Mostly a dual carriageway, it also forms the termini of both the Kwinana Freeway and Forrest Highway.

Major intersections

 Old Coast Road south / Mary Street west, Halls Head – to Dawesville, Bunbury, Falcon, Wannanup.
  Mandurah Road (National Route 1), Mandurah – to Rockingham, Perth, Halls Head, Bunbury
 Lakes Road, Greenfields – to North Dandalup
  Kwinana Freeway (State Route 2) north / Forrest Highway (State Route 2) south, Ravenswood – to Stake Hill, Perth, Lake Clifton, Bunbury
 South Yunderup Road, Ravenswood – to South Yunderup
  South Western Highway, Pinjarra – to North Dandalup, Perth, Waroona, Bunbury

See also

References

Roads in Western Australia